The Socialist Party of the Canaries (PSC-PSOE) is the Canarian federation of the Spanish Socialist Workers' Party (PSOE), the main centre-left party in Spain since the 1970s.

Electoral performance

Parliament of the Canary Islands

Cortes Generales

European Parliament

Notes

References

Canaries
Political parties in the Canary Islands
Political parties with year of establishment missing
Social democratic parties in Spain